Kibera Kid is a short film set in the Kibera slums in Nairobi, Kenya. It was written, directed and co-produced by Nathan Collett in collaboration with the locals of Kibera.

This twelve-minute film featured Kibera actors in the principal roles. It has played at film festivals worldwide including the Berlin Film Festival and it won a Student EMMY from Hollywood. It has been profiled by the BBC, Reuters and Al Jazeera English. In April 2009, a feature film follow up to Kibera Kid was shot. The full length film focuses on tribal conflict and the possibility of reconciliation. The film had a larger effect as it led to the formation of Hot Sun Foundation which trains the youth of the slums to make their own films.

Plot
Kibera Kid is the story of Otieno, a 12-year-old orphan from Kibera living with a gang of thieves who must make a choice between gang life and redemption. The story is fiction but the circumstances and reality depicted are not. Crime and poverty are common in Kibera, yet there are many who will stand for a better life no matter how bad things may seem.

Awards
 2006 Hamptons International Film Festival winner of Best Student Film
 2006 Kenya International Film Festival winner of Best short film
 2006 Angelus Film Festival winner of Director's Choice
 2007 Student Emmys winner of Best Children's program

References

External links
 Article on Togetherness Supreme
 Kibera Kid Official Site and DVD
 Al Jazeera English News report on Kibera Kid
 Kibera Kid Trailer on Youtube
 
 Blogspot.com, Kibera Kid Blog - Follow the progress of the feature film
 

2006 films
2006 short documentary films
Kenyan short documentary films